Streptomyces flavofungini is a bacterium species from the genus of Streptomyces which has been isolated from desert sand. Streptomyces flavofungini produces flavofungin I, flavofungin II.

See also 
 List of Streptomyces species

References

Further reading

External links
Type strain of Streptomyces flavofungini at BacDive -  the Bacterial Diversity Metadatabase

flavofungini
Bacteria described in 1986